The Fakhro Group, also known as the Abdulla Yousif Fakhro Group, is a collection of businesses owned by the descendants of the late Abdulla bin Yousif Fakhro established in 1888. The group is one of the oldest and most prominent family businesses in the Kingdom of Bahrain. The collection of businesses are currently headquartered in Manama, Bahrain with operations in Qatar and the UAE.

History
The Fakhro Group was founded by Yousif bin Abdulrahman Fakhro in 1888 and started off as a traditional merchant house. Yousif bin Abdulrahman remained at the helm of the business from the early 20th century until he died in 1952. During the 1930s and 1940s, Yousif sent each of his five sons to manage the family's business interests in India, Dubai, Bahrain and Iraq (where Abdulla bin Yousif Fakhro was to be based for numerous years). During this period, the small business dealing in dates and building materials expanded into shipping, with around 40 dhows, and established branches in the GCC, Iraq, and India. The company's product portfolio grew to encompass cars, timber, foodstuff, and electronics.

After Yousif bin Abdulrahman's death in 1952, Abdulla bin Yousif and his brothers jointly controlled the family business. Abdulla later acquired most of the businesses from his brothers and, with the help of his sons, embarked on an ambitious growth strategy to take the group to where it is today, with interests in automotive products and services, restaurants, shipping logistics, insurance, and IT services.

Although the group currently consists of 14 individual companies, it is actively adding divisions and evaluating new initiatives in the Persian Gulf. The company currently operates in Bahrain, Qatar, and Dubai, and Abu Dhabi, and is in the process of expanding into Saudi Arabia and Kuwait.

Operations
Today, the group's operations include automotive and industrial products, technology, restaurants, shipping, insurance broking, transport, and agencies.

Agencies
McDonald's
Sony Ericsson
Avaya
Dunlop Tyres
Mobil
Budget Rent a Car
AIG
GAC Logistics

See also
 Fakhro Tower

References

Abdulla Yousif Fakhro Obituary

1888 establishments in Bahrain
Conglomerate companies established in 1888
Conglomerate companies of Bahrain
Companies based in Manama